Woods Mill is an unincorporated community in Nelson County, Virginia, United States.  It was among the communities severely affected by flash flooding from Hurricane Camille in 1969.

References
GNIS reference

Unincorporated communities in Nelson County, Virginia
Unincorporated communities in Virginia